This is the first edition of the tournament.

Marco Cecchinato won the title, defeating Kimmer Coppejans in the final, 6–2, 6–3.

Seeds

Draw

Finals

Top half

Bottom half

References
 Main Draw
 Qualifying Draw

ATP Challenger Torino - Singles
2015 Singles